Panjwayi (also spelled Panjwaye, Panjwaii, Panjway, Panjawyi, Panjwa'i, or Panjwai) is a district in Kandahar Province, Afghanistan. The district borders Helmand Province to the southwest, Maywand District to the west, Zhari District to the north, Arghandab, Kandahar and Daman districts to the east and Reg District to the south. Panjwayi was reduced in size in 2004 when Zhari District was created out of the northern part of it, on the northern side of the Arghandab River, which now forms the northern boundary.

The district center is Bazar-i-Panjwayi, located in the northern part of the district near the Arghandab River. The district population was around 77,200 in 2006, most of which are peasants and poorly educated due to unavailability of schools. The area is irrigated by the Helmand and Arghandab Valley Authority.

War in Afghanistan

Panjwayi was the site of continual fighting and emplacements of improvised explosive devices (IED) during the War in Afghanistan, with the bulk of the Canadian Forces' casualties taken from this district. It was the scene of the Battle of Panjwayi involving Canadian Forces and Taliban fighters and the theatre of the ISAF Operation Medusa, September 2006. NATO claimed to have killed over 500 Taliban insurgents.

The 2009 increase in ISAF forces, brought on about by the U.S. surge, increased troop densities in Panjwayi, resulting in a greater ability on behalf of Afghan government and international forces to conduct operations and penetrate into former Taliban strongholds, especially villages in the "Horn of Panjwayi" such as Mushan, Nejat, Talokan, Sperwan Ghar and Zangabad. These villages are considered the "Birthplace of the Taliban" and were seen as one of the most dangerous regions of Afghanistan for NATO forces. On 16 November 2009 Canadian troops captured the Taliban-controlled village of Hajji Baba southwest of Kandahar City.

The Kandahar massacre occurred at around 3:00 AM on Sunday, March 11, 2012, when 38-year-old U.S. Army staff sergeant Robert Bales from Joint Base Lewis-McChord (in Washington), went from house to house in two separate villages in the district (Balandi and Alokzai) and killed 16 Afghan civilians, including 9 children.

The Taliban maintained a significant psychological and physical presence in the district, and recaptured it on 10 July 2021, during the 2021 Taliban offensive.

Populated places
Alkozai
Balandi 
Bazar-i-Panjwayi
Najeeban
Zangabad

See also 
Khosrow Sofla
Tarok Kolache

References

External links
AIMS District Map, January 2004, before Zhari District was created
Map after Zhari District was split off, Institute for the Study of War

 
Districts of Kandahar Province